Handsworth, Booth Street is a tram stop in Handsworth, Birmingham, England. It was opened on 31 May 1999 and is situated on West Midlands Metro Line 1. It is situated on the site of the old Handsworth and Smethwick railway station, which closed in 1972.

The Birmingham to Worcester railway line runs alongside, but the stop is served only by trams, as there are no railway platforms. 

Immediately south of the tram stop the Metro passes over a modern bridge which takes the line over a siding for an adjacent scrap metal works.  This bridge was constructed under instruction from Network Rail.

Services
Mondays to Fridays, Midland Metro services in each direction between Birmingham and Wolverhampton run at six to eight-minute intervals during the day, and at fifteen-minute intervals during the evenings and on Sundays. They run at eight minute intervals on Saturdays.

References

 History and images of the stop

Transport in Birmingham, West Midlands
West Midlands Metro stops
Railway stations in Great Britain opened in 1999